The 2017 Essendon Football Club season is Essendon's 119th season in the Australian Football League.

Squad

Season summary

Pre-season

Home and Away season

Finals

Ladder

References

Essendon Football Club seasons
Essendon